Neithalath Mohan Kumar (N. Mohan Kumar) (born 12 May 1951) is an Indian mathematician who specializes in commutative algebra and algebraic geometry. Kumar is a full professor at Washington University in St. Louis.

In 1994, he was awarded the Shanti Swarup Bhatnagar Prize for Science and Technology, the highest science award in India  in the mathematical sciences category. Kumar has made profound and original contributions to commutative algebra and algebraic geometry. He is well known for his contribution settling the Eisenbud-Evans conjecture proposed by David Eisenbud. His work on rational double points on rational surfaces has also been acclaimed.

References

Algebraic geometers
1951 births
Living people
University of Mumbai alumni
Washington University in St. Louis faculty
Washington University in St. Louis mathematicians
Recipients of the Shanti Swarup Bhatnagar Award in Mathematical Science